Chet Baker & Strings is an album by jazz trumpeter Chet Baker recorded in late 1953 and early 1954 and released on the Columbia label.

Reception

Lindsay Planer of Allmusic stated: "This release offers a unique glimpse of a young Chet Baker in a quintet setting, complemented by a nine-piece string section... The easygoing and otherwise winding strings support the cool bop like a kite in a March breeze — light, airy, and conspicuous only in altitude".

Track listing
 "You Don't Know What Love Is" (Don Raye, Gene de Paul) - 3:30
 "I'm Thru With Love" (Fud Livingston, Gus Kahn, Matty Malneck) - 2:39
 "Love Walked In" (George Gershwin, Ira Gershwin) - 2:59
 "You Better Go Now" (Irvin Graham, Bickley Reichner) - 3:06
 "I Married An Angel" (Lorenz Hart, Richard Rodgers) - 3:37 
 "Love" (Hugh Martin, Ralph Blane) - 2:34
 "I Love You" (Cole Porter) - 2:48
 "What a Diff'rence a Day Made" (María Grever, Stanley Adams) - 2:40
 "Why Shouldn't I?" (Cole Porter) - 3:35
 "A Little Duet for Zoot and Chet" (Jack Montrose) - 2:37
 "The Wind" (Russ Freeman) - 4:02
 "Trickleydidlier" (Shorty Rogers) - 2:40   
 "You Don't Know What Love Is" [Alternate Take] (Raye, de Paul) - 3:30 Bonus track on CD reissue
 "You Better Go Now" [Alternate Take] (Reichner, Graham) - 3:09 Bonus track on CD reissue   
 "A Little Duet for Zoot and Chet" [Alternate Take] (Montrose) - 2:39 Bonus track on CD reissue  
Recorded in Los Angeles, California on December 30, 1953 (tracks 3, 5, 10, 14 & 15), December 31, 1953 (tracks 1, 2, 9, 12 & 13) and February 20, 1954 (tracks 4, 6-8 & 11).

Personnel
Chet Baker - trumpet
Bud Shank - alto saxophone, flute (tracks 4, 6-8 & 11)
Zoot Sims - tenor saxophone (tracks 1-3, 5, 9, 10 & 12-15)
Russ Freeman - piano
Joe Mondragon  - bass
Shelly Manne - drums
Sam Cytron, Jack Gasselin, George Kast, Eudice Shapiro, Paul Shure, Felix Slatkin - violin
Lou Kievman, Paul Robyn - viola
Victor Gottlieb cello
Jack Montrose (tracks 4, 10, 14 & 15), Johnny Mandel (tracks 1, 6, 7, 11 & 13), Marty Paich (tracks 3 & 5), Shorty Rogers (tracks 2, 8, 9 & 12) - arrangers

References 

1954 albums
Chet Baker albums
Albums arranged by Marty Paich
Albums arranged by Johnny Mandel
Albums arranged by Shorty Rogers
Columbia Records albums